The 2020 Britcar Endurance Championship (known for sponsorship reasons as the 2020 Dunlop Endurance Championship) was a motor racing championship for GT cars, touring cars and sportscars held across England. The championship's field consists of varying types of cars from sportscar to GT and touring cars that compete in four classes, depending on horsepower, momentum, etc. It was the 19th season of a Britcar championship, the 9th run as the Britcar Endurance Championship, and the 5th run as the Dunlop Britcar Endurance Championship. It was the first Dunlop Endurance Championship run without Class 5 and below, after the formation of the Britcar Trophy Championship. The season began on 11 July at Croft Circuit and ended on 1 November at Snetterton Circuit. There was also a non-championship round at the Spa-Francorchamps in support of the 2019-20 FIA World Endurance Championship, where Endurance category competitors will participate in two races with the Trophy Category cars.

Danny Harrison and Jem Hepworth won the overall and Class 1 championships, reigning champions Paul Bailey and Andy Schultz, along with Ross Wylie won Class 2, Dave Benett and Marcus Fothergill won the Class 3 championship and Luke Davenport, Mark Davenport and Marcos Vivian won the Class 4 championship.

Calendar
The opening rounds of the championship at Donington Park were scheduled to be held on 10 April 2020. The season includes a non-championship round at Spa-Francorchamps postponed due to the COVID-19 pandemic. The Spa-Francorchamps round was moved to 15 August.

Teams and drivers 
Cars are assigned classed based on speed, horsepower, momentum, equipment fitted to the car and the car's model;
Class 1: GT3, prototype cars
Class 2: GT4, cup (one-make series) cars
Class 3: Cup (one-make series) cars
Class 4: GT4, cup and TCR cars

Entries that didn't participate
These entries were previously announced to compete in the 2020 season but couldn't due to the 2019-20 coronavirus pandemic.

Results

Overall championship standings 

Points are awarded as follows in all classes

† – Drivers did not finish the race, but were classified as they completed over 60% of the race distance and were awarded half points.

Class championship standings 

Points are awarded as follows in all classes

† – Drivers did not finish the race, but were classified as they completed over 60% of the race distance and were awarded half points.

Notes

References

External links

Britcar
Britcar
Britcar Endurance Championship seasons
Britcar Endurance Championship